Urbandale is an unincorporated community in Alexander County, Illinois, United States. Urbandale is located on Illinois Route 37 north of Cairo. Urbandale is located at latitude 37.053 and longitude -89.186. The elevation of Urbandale is 312 feet.

Education
It is in the Cairo School District.

References

Unincorporated communities in Alexander County, Illinois
Unincorporated communities in Illinois
Cape Girardeau–Jackson metropolitan area
Illinois populated places on the Ohio River